The White Fang is a 1946 Soviet drama film directed by Aleksandr Zguridi.

Plot 
The film is based on the eponymous novel by Jack London. The film tells about a wolf named White Fang, who, as a result of the death of his mother, was an orphan, and a young man named Jack who goes to the Klondike and meets a wolf on the way.

Starring 
 Oleg Zhakov as Weedon Scott
 Yelena Izmailova as Alisa, his wife
 Lev Sverdlin as Matt
 Nikolai Plotnikov as Handsome Smith, the bar owner (as P. Plotnikov)
 Osip Abdulov as Tim Keenan, the owner of the bulldog
 Ivan Bobrov as Gold prospector (as I. Bobrov)
 Emmanuil Geller as Gold prospector
 Viktor Latyshevskiy as Gold prospector (as V. Latyshevsky)
 Pyotr Repnin as Gold prospector

References

External links 
 

1946 films
1940s Russian-language films
Soviet drama films
1946 drama films
Soviet black-and-white films
Films about wolves
Films about mining
Films set in the Arctic
Films set in Yukon
Films shot in Russia
Films based on White Fang